The 2004 FIA GT Magny-Cours 500 km was the third round the 2004 FIA GT Championship season.  It took place at the Circuit de Nevers Magny-Cours, France, on 2 May 2004.

Official results
Class winners in bold.  Cars failing to complete 70% of winner's distance marked as Not Classified (NC).

Statistics
 Pole position – #4 Konrad Motorsport – 1:36.174
 Fastest lap – #5 Vitaphone Racing Team – 1:39.093
 Race winner average speed – 154.130 km/h

References

 
  
 

M
Magny-Cours 500
FIA GT Magny-Cours 500km